The Warsaw Stock Exchange (WSE), is a stock exchange in Warsaw, Poland. It has a market capitalization of PLN 1.05 trillion (EUR 232 billion; as of December 23, 2020).

The WSE is a member of the Federation of European Securities Exchanges. On 17 December 2013, the WSE also joined the United Nations Sustainable Stock Exchanges (SSE) initiative.

History

Kingdom of Poland
Warsaw became the capital and financial center of Poland in the early 17th century. In the Middle Ages other Polish towns, most of them members of the Hanse, were the leading economic centers of Poland. Merchants from western and southern Europe settled in Poland since the beginning of Polish statehood. They brought the system of organized exchange trading in securities, mostly bills and currencies, to Poland. The oldest Polish bill was issued in 1243 by the Cuyavien bishop Sambor. The main centers of securities tradings were at the lower Vistula, in the 14th century occupied by the Teutonic Knights. The first mercantile exchanges emerged in Gdańsk (1379), Toruń (1385), Malbork (14th century), Kraków (1405), Poznań (1429), Zamość (1590), Królewiec (1613) and Elbląg (1744). Mediaeval mercantile exchanges might have also existed for a short period in Chełmno, Grudziądz and Braniewo.

Polish–Lithuanian Commonwealth
Early mercantile trade in securities emerged in Warsaw in the 15th and 16th century and was based on privileges by the Masovian Dukes and later Polish Kings. The original privileges are lost, but they have been mentioned and affirmed by King John II Casimir in 1658. An archetype of the Warsaw Exchange was first mentioned in 1624–1625. In 1643 Adam Zarzebski, the chief architect of King Władysław IV, mentioned a stone building on the Old Market Square as the seat of the Exchange, probably a part of the Old Town Hall. The securities trading minutes of the Warsaw merchants in the Old Town Hall have been recorded since 1757. The legal framework for the trading in securities was first codified by the Polish Sejm in 1775. As one of the first Polish corporations Kompania Manufaktur Welnianych issued its first 120 shares in 1768. The first Polish bonds were issued in 1782 by King Stanisław August.

Duchy of Warsaw
In 1808 the Duchy of Warsaw adopted the Napoleonic code including the Code de Commerce. The Code de Commerce also regulated stock exchange law and there were efforts made to establish a state-organized exchange on the basis of this code in Warsaw. However, due to the Napoleonic Wars and the Congress of Vienna, the plans had to be postponed.

Congress Poland
The first state-organized exchange in Poland, the Warsaw Mercantile Exchange (Giełda Kupiecka w Warszawie), was established in Warsaw by a decree of viceregent Grand Duke Constantine Romanov dated 12 May 1817. The first trading took place in the Old Town Hall on 16 May 1817 and moved in the same year to the Saxon Palace as the Old Town Hall was destroyed in the same year. Exchange trading in securities also was held in the trading house Marywil but were moved to the house of building of the Polish Central Bank in 1828 and to the building of the Financial Commission and Confraternity Harmonia in 1876, before in 1877 the Warsaw Mercantile Exchange moved into its own building at the Saxon Garden.

The Warsaw Mercantile Exchange grew rapidly. The number of brokers doubled between 1817 and 1822. In the first half of the 19th century mainly bills, debentures and bonds were traded, while share trading on a broader scale developed in the second half of that century. The first public security to be traded on the Warsaw Mercantile Exchange was the debentures of Towarzystwo Kredytowe Ziemskie issued in 1826. The first shares admitted to trading were issued by railroad companies in the 1840s. Until 1853 trading sessions were twice a week between 1pm and 2pm. In 1873 a new, more liberal, stock exchange act was passed, separating the trade in securities and commodities. A separate Warsaw Commodities Exchange was founded in 1874. Central Europe was subject to a big bull market after the Prussian-Franco War of 1870–1871, followed by a harsh crash starting at the Vienna Stock Exchange in the later 1870s. However, the Warsaw Mercantile Exchange constantly grew until the First World War. In 1915 Warsaw was occupied by German and Austrian forces and the exchange was closed down during the later years of the war.

Second Polish Republic
The Warsaw Money Exchange (Giełda Pieniężna w Warszawie) was reopened after the First World War in 1919 and again in 1921. Between 1919 and 1939, the Warsaw Money Exchange was by far the largest of several bourses in different Polish cities (Katowice, Kraków, Lwów, Łódź, Poznań and Wilno), and accounted for 95% of the volume and 65 to 85% of the transactions traded on the Polish capital market. The Warsaw Money Exchange had more than 150 participants, 25 brokers, and more than 130 issuers. Its yearly turnover amounted to 1 billion PLZ. A new stock exchange law was passed in 1921 and again in 1926 and 1935. The Polish exchanges were subject to the world crises of 1929, but they recovered in the second half of the 1930s until the Second World War. In 1939 Poland was occupied by German and Soviet forces and all Polish stock exchanges were closed.

Third Polish Republic
It was only after the end of communism in Poland in 1989 that the Warsaw Stock Exchange could be reestablished. Much needed experience and financial aid was provided by France (especially the Société des Bourses Françaises). The WSE began activity in its present form on 16 April 1991. On the first trading day only five stocks were listed (Tonsil, Próchnik, Krosno, Kable, and Exbud).  Seven brokerages took part in the trading, and there were 112 buy and sell orders, with a turnover of only 1,990 złotys ($2,000).

In the years 1991–2000, the stock exchange was in the building which during the previous, and then recent, communist years had been the seat of the Central Committee of the ruling Polish United Workers' Party. This can be considered an interesting reflection on the rapid transition of Poland from a communist to a market economy.

Since then the WSE has been developing and growing rapidly and is now perceived as well established on the European market. In September 2008 the stock exchange was recognized as an "Advanced Emerging" exchange by FTSE, alongside markets from such countries as South Korea or Taiwan.

On 29 September 2017, the index provider FTSE Russell has announced the results of the annual classification of markets. Polish market has been upgraded from Emerging Market to Developed Market status.

Legal framework
The legal framework for exchange operations is provided by three acts from 29 July 2005:

 Act on Public Offering, Conditions Governing the Introduction of Financial Instruments to Organised Trading, and Public Companies
 Act on Trading in Financial Instruments
 Act on Capital Market Supervision

Additionally, the WSE is governed by the Code of Commercial Companies of 2000, the Statutes of the Warsaw Stock Exchange, the Rules of the Warsaw Stock Exchange, and the Rules of the Stock Exchange Court.

Structure and operations
The WSE is a joint stock company founded by the State Treasury. The Treasury holds 35% share in capital.

The following instruments are traded on the WSE: shares, bonds, subscription rights, allotments, and derivatives such as futures, options, and index participation units.

Since its inception, the WSE has engaged in electronic trading.  The WARSET trading platform has been in use from November 2000 to April 2013; it has been superseded by the UTP platform, based on the NYSE Euronext platform formerly having the same name.  An additional market called NewConnect was introduced on 30 August 2007.

The exchange has pre-market sessions from 08:00am to 09:00am, normal trading sessions from 09:00am to 04:50pm and post-market sessions from 04:50pm to 05:00pm on all days of the week except Saturdays, Sundays and holidays declared by the Exchange in advance.

Authorities
The highest authority of the Warsaw Stock Exchange is the General Meeting of Shareholders of the WSE. All Stock Exchange shareholders have the right to participate in the general meeting.

The Exchange Supervisory Board supervises the activities of the Exchange. It consists of 5 to 7 members. The Exchange Supervisory Board meets at least once a quarter. The term of office of its members is joint and lasts three years.

The Exchange Management Board manages the day-to-day operations of the Exchange, admits securities to exchange trading, defines the rules for introducing securities to trading, supervises the activities of exchange brokers and exchange members in the field of exchange trading.

The Exchange Management Board consists of 3 to 5 members. The work of the management board is managed by the President of the management board appointed by the General Meeting. Currently, the president of the WSE is Marek Dietl.

Statistics
The capitalisation of 432 domestic companies listed on the Main Market was PLN 645.0 billion (EUR 152.6 billion) at the end of June 2017. 
The total capitalisation of 483 domestic and foreign companies listed on the GPW Main Market was PLN 1,316.5 billion (EUR 311.5 billion) at the end of June 2017.
Total value of trade in equities on the Main Market was PLN 30.3 billion

Stock market indices
There are fifteen indices on the WSE.
 WIG
 WIG20
 WIG30
 mWIG40
 sWIG80

Sector indices
 WIG-BANKI
 WIG-BUDOW
 WIG-CHEMIA
 WIG-DEWEL
 WIG-ENERG
 WIG-INFO
 WIG-MEDIA
 WIG-PALIWA
 WIG-PL
 WIG-SPOZYW
 WIG-SUROWCE
 WIG-TELKOM

See also
 List of stock exchanges
 List of European stock exchanges
 Polish Financial Supervision Authority
 NewConnect

References

External links 

 Warsaw Stock Exchange
 Warsaw Stock Exchange not at the World Federation of Exchanges
 NewConnect
 WSEInfoSpace

 
Financial services companies established in 1991
1991 establishments in Poland
Buildings and structures in Warsaw
Stock exchanges in Poland
Government-owned companies of Poland
Companies listed on the Warsaw Stock Exchange